The 2014 Brandenburg state election was held on 14 September 2014 to elect the members of the 6th Landtag of Brandenburg. The incumbent coalition government of the Social Democratic Party (SPD) and The Left led by Minister-President Dietmar Woidke retained its majority and continued in office.

Parties
The table below lists parties represented in the 5th Landtag of Brandenburg.

Opinion polling

Election result
The Brandenburg United Civic Movements/Free Voters entered the Landtag despite falling short of the 5% electoral threshold because of the "basic mandate clause" in electoral law, which exempts parties that win at least one direct mandate from the threshold. The BVB/FW leader Christoph Schulze won Teltow-Fläming III, situated south of Berlin, with 27% of first votes. His success was attributed to discontent with the new Berlin Brandenburg Airport in this area, which lies in the designated approach corridor. Schulze's advocacy of a ban on night flights had been the reason for his defection from the ruling SPD (which he had represented in parliament since 1990) to the BVB/FW.

|-
| colspan=9 align=center| 
|-
! colspan="2" | Party
! Votes
! %
! +/-
! Seats 
! +/-
! Seats %
|-
| bgcolor=| 
| align=left | Social Democratic Party (SPD)
| align=right| 313,177
| align=right| 31.9
| align=right| 1.1
| align=right| 30
| align=right| 1
| align=right| 34.1
|-
| bgcolor=| 
| align=left | Christian Democratic Union (CDU)
| align=right| 226,844
| align=right| 23.0
| align=right| 3.2
| align=right| 21
| align=right| 2
| align=right| 23.9
|-
| bgcolor=| 
| align=left | The Left (Linke)
| align=right| 183,172
| align=right| 18.6
| align=right| 8.6
| align=right| 17
| align=right| 9
| align=right| 19.3
|-
| bgcolor=| 
| align=left | Alternative for Germany (AfD)
| align=right| 119,989
| align=right| 12.2
| align=right| New
| align=right| 11
| align=right| New
| align=right| 12.5
|-
| bgcolor=| 
| align=left | Alliance 90/The Greens (Grüne)
| align=right| 60,762
| align=right| 6.2
| align=right| 0.5
| align=right| 6
| align=right| 1
| align=right| 6.8
|-
| bgcolor=#0559A6|
| align=left | Brandenburg United Civic Movements/Free Voters (BVB/FW)
| align=right| 26,332
| align=right| 2.7
| align=right| 1.0
| align=right| 3
| align=right| 3
| align=right| 3.4
|-
! colspan=8|
|-
| bgcolor=| 
| align=left | National Democratic Party (NPD)
| align=right| 21,619
| align=right| 2.2
| align=right| 1.5
| align=right| 0
| align=right| ±0
| align=right| 0
|-
| bgcolor=| 
| align=left | Pirate Party Germany (Piraten)
| align=right| 14,593
| align=right| 1.5
| align=right| 1.5
| align=right| 0
| align=right| ±0
| align=right| 0
|-
| bgcolor=| 
| align=left | Free Democratic Party (FDP)
| align=right| 14,389
| align=right| 1.5
| align=right| 5.7
| align=right| 0
| align=right| 7
| align=right| 0
|-
| bgcolor=|
| align=left | Others
| align=right| 4,422
| align=right| 0.4
| align=right| 
| align=right| 0
| align=right| ±0
| align=right| 0
|-
! align=right colspan=2| Total
! align=right| 987,299
! align=right| 100.0
! align=right| 
! align=right| 88
! align=right| ±0
! align=right| 
|-
! align=right colspan=2| Voter turnout
! align=right| 
! align=right| 47.9
! align=right| 19.1
! align=right| 
! align=right| 
! align=right| 
|}

References

External links
Wahlumfragen zur Landtagswahl in Brandenburg Wahlrecht.de

2014 elections in Germany
Elections in Brandenburg
September 2014 events in Germany